The list of shipwrecks in March 1882 includes ships sunk, foundered, grounded, or otherwise lost during March 1882.

1 March

2 March

3 March

4 March

5 March

6 March

7 March

8 March

9 March

12 March

13 March

15 March

17 March

18 March

21 March

22 March

23 March

24 March

25 March

26 March

27 March

29 March

30 March

31 March

Unknown date

References

1882-03
Maritime incidents in March 1882